James Pitts may refer to:
 James Pitts (VC), English recipient of the Victoria Cross
 James Pitts (American Patriot), Massachusetts merchant and American Patriot
 James Pitts (chemist), American chemist and researcher
 James E. Pitts, United States Navy admiral
 Jim Pitts, member of the Texas House of Representatives
 J.E. Pitts (James Edward Pitts), American poet, songwriter and musician